Jagan is an Indian actor and comedian who has appeared in supporting roles in Tamil films. His breakthrough was with K. V. Anand's Ayan, where he played a small-time smuggler Chitti Babu, and the role won him critical acclaim.

He was the anchor of popular show Kadavul Paadhi Mirugam Paadhi, which was about reviewing movies, aired in Vijay TV. The show was pulled off air citing hard-hitting criticism. He is also a prominent TV and stage show host. He also hosts the game show Connexion on Vijay TV. He is married to his longtime girlfriend Vaanmathi.

Filmography

Actor

Director
 Aanandham Aarambham (2022) (Micro Web Series)

Television

References

Indian male film actors
Tamil male actors
Living people
Tamil comedians
Year of birth missing (living people)
Male actors from Chennai